Kalateh-ye Baqi Khan (also Romanized as Kalāteh-ye Bāqī Khān; also known as Kalāteh-ye Bāghī Khān (Persian: کلاته باغی خان), Kalateh-ye Bāqī (Persian: كلاته باقي), and Bāqī Khān) is a village in Jannatabad Rural District, Salehabad County, Razavi Khorasan Province, Iran. At the 2006 census, its population was 269, in 63 families.

References 

Populated places in   Torbat-e Jam County